The Ibanez GR, or Ghostrider is a series of electric guitars produced by Ibanez. Ibanez first produced the Ghostrider prototypes in their Los Angeles Custom Shop. Structurally, it resembles the Ibanez Artist (AR) guitars of the 1970s. The neck has the same width and 24" scale length as the Artist but Ibanez reduced the depth of the body-top arch to produce a flatter profile more like the modern guitars they were producing in the Ibanez RG series guitars.

Ghostrider models
There were three Ghostrider models produced. All were set-neck construction:

GR220
The GR220 had minimalist dot-inlays, chrome hardware, a carved maple top, and two GRP90 pickups. Finishes came in black (GR220BK), a vibrant green (GR220TB) and an enchanting transparent blue. Produced during 1995, 1996.

GR320
The GR320 came with dot inlays and dual humbuckers and was available in black (GR320BK) and cherry (GR320CH) with black hardware. It had a Fender Telecaster style bridge, and the bridge humbucker was mounted in this housing. Al Jourgensen was pictured with this guitar in an old Ibanez advertisement. They were introduced in 1994 and produced for a very short time.

GR520
The GR520 had a pair of 'Infinity' humbuckers, an alder body with a carved maple top, gold hardware, pearl/abalone block inlays and either vintage sunburst (GR520VS) or orange sunburst (GR520OS) finishes. It was introduced in 1994.

References

GR